Alto's Odyssey is an endless runner and a sandboarding video game developed by Team Alto and Snowman and published by Noodlecake Studios. It was released in 2018 for iOS and Android. It is the sequel to Alto's Adventure (2015).

Gameplay

Alto's Odyssey keeps the same basic gameplay of the original, being a side-scrolling endless runner based around snowboarding (now sandboarding). The player can jump by tapping the screen and do tricks by holding down on it. By doing tricks the player can increase their score which gets added to an online leaderboard at the end of their run. The sequel is set in a desert which features three "biomes" you can unlock that each focus on different mechanics.

In the beginning of the game, the player starts in the dunes, which features rolling hills and rocks for the player to avoid. Another biome is the canyons, which highlights the new wall riding mechanic, allowing the player to climb up the side of canyon walls by holding down on the screen. The final biome is the temples, which has vines which the player can ride on and waterfalls that can speed up the character. Later in the game it is possible to unlock a compass which allows the player to travel between biomes for a fixed cost in coins.

The game adds new features, such as wall-riding, water mechanics, tornadoes, falling platforms, a new power up, and balloon bouncing; and mechanics returning from the first installment such as a day-night cycle, weather, and the wingsuit. Like its predecessor, in addition to its original game mode, it also has a Zen mode, in which the player is invulnerable and can get up after hitting obstacles.

The game also retains the challenge system of the first game, where completing challenges allows the player to level up and unlock new characters. In Odyssey's "Workshop", the player can spend coins they collected in order to upgrade power-ups or unlock new abilities and features.

Development
Team Alto announced a sequel, Alto's Odyssey, in December 2016. It was supposed to launch in the summer of 2017 but was delayed until early 2018. The team behind Alto's Odyssey has shared that "their goal was to make it perfect". On February 12, 2018, Snowman and Nesbitt (dubbed "Team Alto") announced the official release date with a trailer on their YouTube channel. The game was set to release on February 22, 2018, as shown in the trailer.The game was intended to be a successor to Alto's Adventure, rather than a game that rethought the mechanics of the series. Other mechanics such as a grappling hook were considered, but were axed because they complicated the one-touch gameplay. Wall riding and balloon bouncing were added in order to add more verticality into the world as Team Alto felt the game world was too static in Adventure. The new biomes expanded the scope of the game a great deal, with one developer commenting "That approach required us to virtually triple the amount of assets we were producing, and item zones we were creating to place content in the environment". Each area was designed to feel distinct to play, instead of being a purely visual change. The ruins in particular were inspired by the worlds of games like Journey and Ico.
Code from the original game was used in Odyssey, but was significantly modified. Odyssey uses the Metal API on iOS, which the developers switched to for better performance and stability over OpenGL. The game aims for a 60 frames per second target, and uses lower quality shaders for weaker hardware in order to maintain performance. Odyssey takes advantage of Apple's haptic engine in order to give feedback for landing a trick or when the player interacts with the game world.

Alto's Odyssey was initially released only on iOS, with an Android release slated for a later date.  On February 21, 2018, the game was released on the App Store one day early, at a price of US$4.99. On June 4 of that year, the game was awarded with an Apple Design Award for Outstanding Design and Innovation. Later, on July 25, it was released on the Android platform as a free-to-play game. In an interview with Team Alto, they cited disappointing revenue for premium games on Android as the reason for turning to a free-to-play model. On August 4, 2019, Team Alto announced that Alto's Odyssey, alongside Alto's Adventure, would be released for Microsoft Windows, PlayStation 4, and Xbox One on August 13, 2020, as part of The Alto's Collection. A Nintendo Switch version was released on November 26, 2020. A version for Apple Arcade with an additional city area was released on July 16, 2021, under the title, Alto’s Odyssey: The Lost City.

Reception

Computer Games Magazine's Alex Handziuk praised the sound design of the game, writing that the game was "immensely calming" and "full of lush piano motifs and swelling crescendos that do a superb job of invoking emotion in the player". He also enjoyed the game's Zen mode, saying that " I genuinely felt a feeling of relaxation while playing the mode and it works surprisingly well as a form of meditation".

Pocket Gamer thought that Alto's Odyssey's visuals improved over its predecessor, remarking "Alto’s Odyssey manages to one-up Adventure in terms of creating a gorgeous atmosphere". However, the outlet criticized the game for sticking too close to the first game, making the game feel familiar.

Carter Dotson of TouchArcade liked the new biomes as he thought they gave more variety to each run. Dotson criticized the amount of coins required to unlock new items, saying that the game "becomes about the grind to get more coins".

The game was nominated for "Fan Favourite Mobile Game" at the Gamers' Choice Awards; the A-Train Award for Best Mobile Game at the New York Game Awards; "Mobile Game of the Year" at the SXSW Gaming Awards; "Excellence in Visual Art" and "Excellence in Audio" at the Independent Games Festival Awards; "Best Mobile Game" at the Game Developers Choice Awards; "Mobile Game" at the 15th British Academy Games Awards, and "Best Mobile Game" at the Italian Video Game Awards.

References

External links
 

2018 video games
IOS games
Android (operating system) games
Indie video games
Endless runner games
Single-player video games
Video games developed in Canada
Video games featuring protagonists of selectable gender
Snowboarding video games
Windows games
PlayStation 4 games
Xbox One games
Nintendo Switch games
Video game sequels
Apple Design Awards recipients
Noodlecake Games games